Zabikhillo Urinboev (born 30 March 1995) is an Uzbekistani footballer who plays as a forward. He currently plays for PFC Navbahor Namangan.

He made his debut for the Uzbekistan national football team in May 2018 against Iran in a friendly. He has also played for Uzbekistani youth teams in international tournaments such as the 2011 FIFA U-17 World Cup, the 2013 FIFA U-20 World Cup, the 2015 FIFA U-20 World Cup, and the 2018 AFC U-23 Championship, which he won.

Honours
 AFC U-23 Championship (1): 2018

References

External links 

Living people
1995 births
Uzbekistani footballers
Uzbekistani expatriate footballers
Uzbekistan international footballers
FC Bunyodkor players
FC AGMK players
Pakhtakor Tashkent FK players
Tokushima Vortis players
Navbahor Namangan players
Uzbekistan Super League players
Association football forwards
Uzbekistani expatriate sportspeople in Japan
Expatriate footballers in Japan